Isuzu Malaysia Sdn Bhd (IMSB) was established on 6 September 2004 as a commercial vehicle manufacturer. The company headquarters located in Petaling Jaya, Malaysia. The plant development is a joint venture between DRB-HICOM, Isuzu Operations (Thailand) Co. Ltd. and Isuzu Motors Asia Ltd. The management of the plant of about 700 workers is under the authority of the CEO Kenji Matsuoka. Isuzu Malaysia produces the Isuzu N-Series and the popular Isuzu D-Max. Over 5,000 vehicles are produced here annually.

Current models

Former model

External links
Isuzu Malaysia Sdn. Bhd. homepage
Isuzu Malaysia at Wikimapia

References
German Wikipedia page

2004 establishments in Malaysia
Privately held companies of Malaysia
Isuzu
Truck manufacturers of Malaysia
Vehicle manufacturing companies established in 2004
Companies based in Petaling Jaya
DRB-HICOM